Joseph Henry Lumpkin (December 23, 1799 – June 4, 1867) was a slave owner and the first chief justice of the  Supreme Court of the U.S. state of Georgia.

Biography

Early life and education
Lumpkin was born in Oglethorpe County, Georgia. He attended the University of Georgia (UGA) in Athens, Georgia, for some time and then attended and graduated from Princeton College in 1819. After studying law under the tutelage of Thomas W. Cobb, Lumpkin was admitted to the state bar in 1820, and he began practicing in Lexington, Georgia.

Career
After serving two terms in the Georgia General Assembly, 1824–1825, Lumpkin turned his full attention to his legal career. In 1830, Lumpkin worked in unison with future U.S. Congressman and Georgia Governor, William Schley, and John H. Cuthbert to create the Georgia  state penal code.

After the creation of the Supreme Court of Georgia in 1845, Lumpkin was elected as one of three initial justices to preside over that court and was its first chief justice. He served on the court for more than 20 years until his death.  Lumpkin was offered the faculty chair of rhetoric and oratory at UGA in 1846, but he declined it. He did the same when offered the chancellorship of UGA in 1860. Even a presidential appointment to a seat on the US Court of Claims was turned down by Lumpkin so that he could remain on the state supreme court.

Lumpkin also had a plantation in Athens, Georgia, where he owned 18 slaves.
One of the slaves he owned was William Finch who he purchased from Judge Garnett Andrews, the father of Eliza Frances Andrews in 1848.

University of Georgia School of Law
He was one of three co-founders of the University of Georgia School of Law in 1859. Originally known as the Lumpkin School of Law; it is now known as the University of Georgia School of Law. Lumpkin taught at the law school until the university shut down during the American Civil War. He also served as a trustee for the school for many years.

Other writings
His writings and policies suggest a mixing of religion, economics, and politics.  For Lumpkin, like many in his era, believed that economic and moral progress went together.:

In the early 1820s Lumpkin underwent an evangelical conversion that profoundly affected his life. He took an active part in the temperance movement on both the national and state levels. He also believed that slavery was sanctioned by the Bible and often cited religious arguments to support continuation of that institution."

However, early in his career he had expressed opposition to slavery.  By the time Lumpkin was on the Georgia Supreme Court, he was devoted to promoting slavery. In an 1850 address to the South Carolina Institute, Lumpkin pointed to corporations and to slavery as key to promoting economic development in the South.

Death
Lumpkin died and was buried in Athens on June 4, 1867.

See also
Joseph Henry Lumpkin House

References

External links
 Family Papers at the Digital Library of Georgia

1799 births
1867 deaths
Georgia (U.S. state) lawyers
University of Georgia alumni
University of Georgia faculty
People from Oglethorpe County, Georgia
Chief Justices of the Supreme Court of Georgia (U.S. state)
Princeton University alumni
19th-century American judges
19th-century American lawyers